Senecio crassiflorus, in , one of the native South American Senecio and an herbaceous dune dwelling perennial.

Description

Leaves Shaped like spatula with roundish, long, narrow, linear bases to having a broad rounded apex and a tapering base. The edges are smooth or toothed towards apex and both surfaces woolly.

Reports claim S. crassiflorus does not produce viable seeds and spreads itself asexually or via vegetative reproduction.

Community species
Ipomoea pes-caprae
Hydrocotyle bonariensis
Juncus acutus
Panicum sabularum
Spartina cf. ciliata
Hydrocotyle umbellata

Colombian communities

In a remote sensing project for rapid ecological evaluation, S. crassiflorus was found in Colombia inhabiting two areas that were evaluated.

A flood prone coastal region: 
 
  Acanthospermum australe
  Acicarpha tribuloides
  Ambrosia tenuifolia
  Androtrichium trigynum
  Azolla sp.
  Bacopa monnieri
  Baccharis articulata
  Cardionema ramosissima
  Centella asiatica
  Cephalanthus glabratus
  Chenopodium retusum
  Cuphea carthagenensis
  Cynodon dactylon
  Cyperus haspan
  Cyperus virens
  Enydra sessilis
  Erechtites hieracifolia
  Eryngium pandanifolium
  Hedyotis salzmanii
  Ischaemum minus
  Juncus microcephalus
  Nymphoides indica
  Panicum racemosum
  Paspalum nicorae
  Petunia litoralis
  Pluchea sagitalis
  Polygonum punctatum
  Pterocaulon sp.
  Ranunculus apiifolius
  Sesbania punicea
  Solanum platense
  Thelipteris interrupta
  Xyris jupicai 
  Zizaniopsis bonariensis

A sandy area near to a forest: 
 
  Acanthospermun australe
  Baccharis arenaria
  Cynodon dactylon
  Fragmites communis
  Hydrocotyle bonariensis
  Mikania micrantha
  Myrcianthes cisplatensis
  Oenothera sp.
  Passiflora caerulea
  Polygonum sp.
  Salyx hunboldtiana
  Sapium glandulosum
  Schoenoplectus californicus
  Sebastiania schottiana
  Sesbania punicea
  Theliptheris interrupta 
  Tillandsia aeranthos

Distribution
Native
Neotropic: 
Brazil: Brazil
Southern South America: Argentina, Uruguay
Current
Neotropic: 
Brazil: Brazil
Southern South America: Argentina, Uruguay
Australasia: 
Australia: New South Wales
New Zealand North: Wellington

References

External links

crassiflorus
Halophytes
Flora of South America
Flora of Brazil